Oliver Ruck Burgham (21 May 1885 – 6 May 1967) was an English professional rugby union and professional rugby league footballer who played in the 1900s and 1910s. He played club level rugby union (RU) for Gloucester RFC, and representative level rugby league (RL) for Great Britain and Wales, and at club level for Ebbw Vale and Halifax (Heritage No., as a forward (prior to the specialist positions of), during the era of contested scrums. He played at Halifax until the outbreak of the First World War.

Background
Oliver Burgham was born in Cinderford, Gloucestershire, England (birth registered in Westbury-on-Severn district), his marriage to Mary J. Kershaw was registered during fourth ¼ 1919 in Lancaster district, and he died aged-81 in Penwortham, Lancashire, England (death registered in Amounderness district).

International honours
Oliver Burgham won caps for Wales while at Ebbw Vale in 1908 against New Zealand, and England, and won a cap for Great Britain while at Halifax in 1911 against Australia.

References

External links
(archived by web.archive.org) Great Britain Statistics at englandrl.co.uk (statistics currently missing due to not having appeared for both Great Britain, and England)
(archived by archive.is) Men of Steel who made Vale great
Search for "Oliver Burgham" at britishnewspaperarchive.co.uk

1885 births
1967 deaths
Ebbw Vale RLFC players
English rugby league players
English rugby union players
Gloucester Rugby players
Great Britain national rugby league team players
Halifax R.L.F.C. players
People from Cinderford
Rugby league forwards
Rugby league players from Gloucestershire
Rugby union players from Gloucestershire
Wales national rugby league team players